is a bullet hell platform game numbered as the 17.5th in the Touhou Project series. The game was developed by Twilight Frontier and Team Shanghai Alice. Sunken Fossil World is the first Touhou spinoff by Twilight Frontier which is not a fighting game. On the official website, the game is described as a "horizontal side-scrolling danmaku water action game". The game consists entirely of boss fights.

Gameplay
Sunken Fossil World is a bullet hell platformer with the structure of an arcade fighting game – the game is centered around continual boss fights instead of typical levels, with the structure of the boss stages changing throughout the fight.

Development
Like all previous Touhou Project spinoffs where Twilight Frontier were involved, ZUN of Team Shanghai Alice only oversaw the development of the game and scenario, while Twilight Frontier actually developed the game.

The game suffered from a troubled development cycle. The first trial demo was released on October 6, 2019, showcasing three different boss fights present in the game. Dialogue for this version was completely unfinished, with all text being displayed in periods.
The second trial demo was released on October 18, 2020, which served as a more ironed out version of the first demo.

The game was supposed to release at Touhou's Reitaisai 18 convention on March 21, 2021, but it was announced that the game would be further delayed, due to parts of the game still being completely missing. It was then set for an August release, but this too was delayed to a September release, which later became October. Because of delays, the game presents a subtitle of "17.5", despite being released after the 18th Touhou game, Unconnected Marketeers.

The game was released at the Autumn Reitaisai on October 24, 2021, and released digitally on Steam on October 29, 2021. The game was updated to Ver 1.02 on 2 November 2021, shortly after release, with a bug patch.

A Nintendo Switch port as well as an update featuring new playable characters and storylines was announced in May 2022. This is scheduled to release October 20, 2022, and will also add English and Chinese language support to both versions of the game.

Soundtrack
The game's soundtrack consists of content from other games in the series that are remixed by ziki_7, apart from the final boss themes, which are new compositions by ZUN.

References

External links
Official website 
Sunken Fossil World on Touhou Wiki

2021 video games
Japan-exclusive video games
Platform games
Single-player video games
Touhou Project games
Twilight Frontier games
Video games developed in Japan
Windows games
Windows-only games